Sir Hans Paus (born 1656 in Hjartdal – 18 March 1715) was a Norwegian priest and poet. He was parish priest in Kviteseid from 1683 until his death. A popular man in his parish who learned the local dialect (at a time when most church officials and civil servants used Danish as a working language), he is noted for being the first to write poetry in dialect in Norway. His poem Stolt Anne (ca. 1700), written in the Kviteseid dialect, became a popular folk song in Telemark. 12 verses were included in Norske Folkeviser (1853) by Magnus Brostrup Landstad and Henrik Ibsen, a relative of Hans Paus, paraphrased the poem in the drama Lady Inger of Ostrat. The poem honored Anne Clausdatter, the owner of Borgestad Manor and a relative of Paus. She rewarded him with an agricultural property (Bukkøy) for it. He owned several agricultural properties in Kviteseid.

Hans Paus was the son of Povel Pedersson Paus (1625–1682), parish priest in Hjartdal, and Ingrid Corneliusdatter Trinnepol, who belonged to the Skien patriciate who had made a fortune in the sawmill industry (her family might originate in Trinitapoli, Italy). Hans Paus married Susanne Amundsdatter Morland, daughter of the provost of Øvre Telemark Amund Hanssøn Morland. He succeeded his father-in-law as parish priest in Kviteseid. Amund Morland, of Danish origin, had succeeded Hans Paus' grandfather Peder Paus (born 1590) as the Kviteseid parish priest and provost; hence, the Paus and Morland families have been referred to as a dynasty of priests in Øvre Telemark. Hans Paus' maternal grandparents were timber merchant, sawmill owner and councilman in Skien, Cornelius Jansen Trinnepol (1611–1678) and Anne Iversdatter (1605–1642), a daughter of councilman Iver Christensen and Margrethe von Ansbach. Susanne's maternal grandparents Christen Andersen and Anne Gundersdatter owned Borgestad Manor.

Original painted portraits from 1685 of Hans and Susanne came in the possession of Christopher Tostrup Paus and are today found at Herresta in Sweden.

Hans Paus was the brother of the judge of Øvre Telemark, Cornelius Paus (1662–1723), who used a coat of arms featuring a wild man.

Notes

References

Literature
D. A. Seip i Norsk Biografisk Leksikon, bd. 10 (1969)
Landstad, Magnus Brostrup: Norske folkeviser (1853)
Berge, Rikard: Bygdedikting fraa Telemarki (bd. 11, 1918)

1656 births
1715 deaths
17th-century Norwegian Lutheran clergy
18th-century Norwegian Lutheran clergy
Norwegian male poets
17th-century Norwegian poets
18th-century Norwegian poets
Hans
History of Vestfold og Telemark
People from Hjartdal